Hey! Hey! Hey! Music Champ was a Japanese music variety show on Fuji Television hosted by the comedy duo Downtown, which consists of Hitoshi Matsumoto and Masatoshi Hamada. It is a very popular show with comical hosts who like to pick on their guests. An episode usually consists of live performances (of recently released songs) from popular artists, chat segments and other fun and games.

Many famous singers such as Ayumi Hamasaki, Britney Spears, Hikaru Utada, and Namie Amuro have performed almost all of their singles on this show.  Japanese rock artists such as Glay, X Japan, Alice Nine, The Gazette, Nightmare, Gackt, DJ Ozma, and L'Arc-en-Ciel have also been on the show performing their hit singles as well as playing games with the hosts. All bands signed under Johnny & Associates have also appeared on the show as guests and have performed their latest hit songs. South Korean boybands SS501, Big Bang, TVXQ and girl groups S.E.S., Girls' Generation, and Kara have also appeared on the show.

On September 18, 2012, Fuji TV announced that "Hey! Hey! Hey! Music Champ" would end its run after eighteen years. The series finale aired on December 17, 2012.

Segments

Music mixture
In this quiz game segment, four or five teams of one or more individuals try to guess songs as they are played four at a time. (As each song is correctly guessed, they are eliminated from the mixture.) Each song has a descending point value, from 40 for the first song guessed to 10 for the last.

The game is played in four rounds, with the final round determining the winner in one of two ways through a random draw. The "NG" variation has one of the four songs in the final rounds taking away 100 points from the individual/team who guessed it. The "Lucky" variation is exactly the reverse: one of the final round songs gives 100 points to the individual/team who guessed it.

Telephone box
In this interview segment, guests are interviewed over a telephone in an English-style phone box.

Rainichi-In
This interview segment focuses on non-Japanese artists that have a loyal following in Japan, such as Ne-Yo and Britney Spears.

Hoshi no resutoran (The Star restaurant)
This segment is a combination interview/cooking show: a chef from a restaurant selected by the guest(s) as his/her/their favorite restaurant cooks for that guest and Downtown.

One notable example of this is when X Japan co-founder Yoshiki noted the Shibuya-based restaurant La Rochelle as his favorite place.
The restaurant's owner/head chef, Hiroyuki Sakai, came on the show to cook a special dish for Yoshiki.

Other competitions
Miscellaneous competition segments have also occurred over the show's run, many of which started rivalries between Downtown and guests. One such example is a 1999 billiards competition between entertainer Masaharu Fukuyama and Hitoshi Matsumoto, which led to an Iron Chef battle between the two.

See also
 FNS Music Festival

References

External links
  

Fuji TV original programming
Japanese music television series
1994 Japanese television series debuts
2012 Japanese television series endings